Errouville (Lorrain: Arovelle, Luxembourgish: Arweller) is a commune in the Meurthe-et-Moselle department in north-eastern France.

As of 2019, it had 699 inhabitants.

History
Between 1871 and 1914 Errouville found itself positioned on the Franco-German frontier.

See also
Communes of the Meurthe-et-Moselle department

References

Communes of Meurthe-et-Moselle